The Sunda flying lemur (Galeopterus variegatus), also known as Sunda colugo, Malayan flying lemur and Malayan colugo, is native to Southeast Asia ranging from southern Myanmar, Thailand, southern Vietnam, Malaysia to Singapore and Indonesia.

Although it is called "flying lemur", it cannot fly but glides among trees and is strictly arboreal. It is active at night, and feeds on soft plant parts such as young leaves, shoots, flowers, and fruits. After a 60-day gestation period, a single offspring is carried on the mother's abdomen held by a large skin membrane. It is a forest-dependent species.

The Sunda flying lemur is protected by national legislation. The Sunda flying lemurs are often hunted by local people with spears or other lethal equipment for various reasons such as food and fur. Habitat loss is known to occur intermittently, particularly in developing countries such as Malaysia. In addition to deforestation and loss of habitat, local subsistence hunting poses a serious threat to this animal. Competition with the plantain squirrel (Callosciurus notatus) represents another challenge for this species. More information is needed on population declines, but at present, the rate of the decline is not believed to merit listing in any category lower than least concern.

Taxonomy and evolution 

The Sunda flying lemurs' two forms are not morphologically distinct from one another; the large form occurs on the mainland of the Sunda Shelf area and the mainland of Southeast Asia, while the dwarf form occurs in central Laos and some other adjacent islands. The Laos specimen is smaller (about 20%) than the other known mainland population. Despite the large and dwarf forms,  four subspecies are known: G. v. variegatus (Java), G. v. temminckii (Sumatra), G. v. borneanus (Borneo), and G. v. peninsulae (Peninsular Malaysia and mainland of Southeast Asia) incorporating on the genetic species concept due to geographic isolation and genetic divergence. Recent molecular and morphological data provide the evidence that the mainland, Javan, and Bornean Sunda flying lemur subspecies may be recognised as three separate species in the genus Galeopterus.

Characteristics 
The Sunda flying lemur is a skillful climber, but is nearly helpless when on the ground. Its gliding membrane connects from the neck, extending along the limbs to the tips of the fingers, toes, and nails. This kite-shaped skin is known as a patagium, which is expanded for gliding. It can glide over a distance of 100 m with a loss of fewer than 10 m in elevation. It has a dorsiflexed and abducted foot while having an abducted clawed grasp. This technique help to climb trees easier and faster while looking for food or staying away from predators.

It weighs .

Distribution and habitat 
The Sunda flying lemur is widely distributed throughout Southeast Asia, ranging from the Sunda Shelf mainland to other islands – Northern Laos, Cambodia, Vietnam, Thailand, Malaysia (Peninsular, Sabah and Sarawak), Singapore, Brunei, Indonesia (Kalimantan, Sumatra, Bali, Java), and many adjacent islands. Conversely, the Philippine flying lemur (C. volans) is confined to the southern parts of the Philippines only.

The Sunda flying lemur is adapted to many different vegetation types, including gardens, primary and secondary forest, rubber and coconut plantations, fruit orchards (dusun), mangrove swamps, lowlands and upland forests, tree plantations, lowland dipterocarp forests, and mountainous areas, but not all of these habitats can sustain large colugo populations.

Behaviour and ecology 
The Sunda flying lemur can maneuver and navigate while gliding, but strong rain and wind can affect its ability to glide. Gliding usually occurs in open areas or high in the canopy, especially in dense tropical rainforest. It needs a certain distance to glide and to land to avoid injury. The highest landing forces are experienced after short glides; longer glides lead to softer landings, due to the colugo's ability to brake its glide aerodynamically. The ability to glide increases a colugo's access to scattered food resources in the rainforest, without increasing exposure to terrestrial or arboreal predators.

In general, the diet of the Sunda flying lemur consists mainly of leaves. It usually consumes leaves with less potassium and nitrogen-containing compounds, but with higher tannin. It also feeds on buds, shoots, coconut flowers, durian flowers, fruits, and sap from selected tree species. It also feeds on insects in Sarawak, Malaysian Borneo. The selected food sources depend on the localities, habitat, vegetation types, and availability.

It is nocturnal, but sometimes can found active in the morning or in the afternoon.

The Sunda flying lemur mainly forages in tree canopies. It may forage on several different tree species in a single night, or on a single species. It can also be seen licking tree bark of selected tree species to obtain water, nutrients, salts, and minerals. It is nocturnal, but sometimes can found active in the morning or in the afternoon.

References

Further reading

 Anon, (2008). Flying lemurs mating, Bako National Park, Sarawak, Malaysia. Accessed date October 7, 2008.
 
 
 
 
 
 
 Dzulhelmi, M.N., Marzuki, H. and Abdullah, M.T. (2010). Observation on the roosting selection of the Sunda Colugo (Galeopterus variegatus) in Bako National Park, Sarawak, Malaysia. Proceedings of Conference on Natural Resources in the Tropics3: Harnessing Tropical Natural Resources Through Innovations and Technologies. pp. 433–439.
 Dzulhelmi, M.N. (2011). Behavioural Ecology of the Sunda Colugo Galeopterus variegatus (Mammalia: Dermoptera) in Bako National Park, Sarawak, Malaysia . MSc. Dissertations. Universiti Malaysia Sarawak, Kota Samarahan.
 Dzulhelmi, N. (2013). Natural History of the Colugo. UKM Press: Bangi.
 Ellerman, J.R. and Morrison-Scott, T.C.S. (1955). Supplement to Chasen, F.N. (1940): A handlist of Malaysian mammals. British Museum. Tonbridge Printers Ltd., London.
 
 
 Khan, M.M. (1992). Mamalia semenanjung Malaysia. Department of Wildlife and National Parks, Kuala Lumpur.
 Kool, K.M. and Nawi, Y. (1995). Catalogue of skin in Sarawak museum, Kuching, Sarawak. Universiti Malaysia Sarawak, Kota Samarahan.
 
 Lim, N.T. (2004). Autecology and a preliminary population census of the Malayan flying lemur Cynocephalus variegatus in Singapore. BSc. Final Year Project. National University of Singapor, Singapore.
 
 Maryanto, I., Anang, S.A., and Agus, P.K. (2008). Mamalia dilindungi perundang-undangan Indonesia. LIPI Press, Jakarta.
 Medway, L. (1978). The wild mammals of Malaya (Peninsular Malaysia) and Singapore. Oxford University Press, Kuala Lumpur.
 
 
 
 
 
 Nowak, R.M. (1999). Mammals of the world. 6th edition. Johns Hopkins University Press, Baltimore.
 Parr, J.W.K., Komolphalin, K. and Wongkalasin, M. (2003). A guide to the large mammals of Thailand. Sarakadee Press, Bangkok.
 Penry, D.L. (1993). Digestive constraints on diet selection. In diet selection: An interdisciplinary approach to foraging behaviour (Hughes, R.N. eds). Blackwell Scientific Publications. Cambridge University Press, Cambridge.
 
 
 
 Stephen, D.W. and Krebs, J.R. (1986). Foraging theory. Princeton University Press, England.

External links 

 

Colugos
Mammals described in 1799
Mammals of Borneo
Mammals of Brunei
Mammals of Indonesia
Mammals of Malaysia
Mammals of Singapore
Mammals of Thailand
Taxa named by Jean-Baptiste Audebert